"Every Single Day" is the debut solo single by Swedish singer Felix Sandman. The song competed in Melodifestivalen 2018, where it made it to the Second Chance round, and then to the final after winning the duel against Mimi Werner. It reached number one on the Swedish singles chart.

Track listing

Charts

Weekly charts

Year-end charts

References

2018 songs
2018 debut singles
English-language Swedish songs
Felix Sandman songs
Songs written by Felix Sandman
Melodifestivalen songs of 2018
Number-one singles in Sweden